The "Bull Elephant" backfield were the American football running backs of the 1950s Los Angeles Rams. The line consisted of Dick Hoerner, Paul "Tank" Younger and "Deacon" Dan Towler. This line helped name the 1951 Rams as the fourth best offense in the history of the NFL and the number one best offense in the history of the NFL for the 1950 Rams by Sports Central.

References

Nicknamed groups of American football players
Los Angeles Rams